Lawrence L. "Larry" Buell Sr. is a Republican member of the Indiana House of Representatives, representing the 89th District from 1994 to 2008. He was previously a member of the Indiana House from 1980 to 1992.

References

External links
Indiana State Legislature - Representative Lawrence Buell Official government website
Project Vote Smart - Representative Lawrence L. Buell Sr. (IN) profile

1934 births
Republican Party members of the Indiana House of Representatives
Living people
Politicians from Indianapolis
Indiana University Bloomington alumni
People from St. Joseph County, Indiana